Mohamud Olow Barrow ,  was a Somali politician. He served as the Minister of Fisheries and Marine Resources of Somalia, having been appointed to the position on 17 January 2014 by Prime Minister Abdiweli Sheikh Ahmed. Barrow died on 16 January 2015 in Mogadishu. A state funeral was held for him later the same day in the capital, which was attended by the late official's family and friends, President Hassan Sheikh Mohamud, Prime Minister Omar Abdirashid Ali Sharmarke, Parliament Speaker Mohamed Osman Jawari, other federal government leaders, and the general public.

References

2015 deaths
Government ministers of Somalia
Year of birth missing